Alvin Hugh McQuillan (September 15, 1895 – August 26, 1947) was an American professional baseball player. He played in Major League Baseball as a pitcher from 1918 to 1927. He played for the Boston Braves and New York Giants.

In 1561.2 innings pitched in 279 games over 10 seasons, McQuillan compiled an 88-94 won-loss record with a 3.83 Earned Run Average, allowing 1703 hits, 489 bases on balls and recording 446 strikeouts. He pitched 10 shutouts and recorded 17 saves. As a hitter, he posted a .195 batting average (103-for-527) with 45 runs, 2 home runs and 37 RBI.

External links

1895 births
1947 deaths
Major League Baseball pitchers
Boston Braves players
New York Giants (NL) players
Baseball players from New York (state)
Toronto Maple Leafs (International League) players
Worcester Busters players
Newark Bears (IL) players
Toledo Mud Hens players
Seattle Indians players
Portland Beavers players
Burials at Calvary Cemetery (Queens)